General elections were held in Liberia on 4 May 1971. In the presidential election, incumbent William Tubman of the True Whig Party was the only candidate, and was re-elected unopposed. In the legislative elections, the True Whig Party won all 52 seats in the House of Representatives.

Results

President

House of Representatives

References

Liberia
1971 in Liberia
Elections in Liberia
Single-candidate elections
May 1971 events in Africa
Election and referendum articles with incomplete results